Incontent://media/external/downloads/39116 1967 Fourth general elections held in Uttar Pradesh. The Indian National Congress won the most seats as well as the largest share of the popular vote. But it could not secure enough seats for a majority and so a coalition of other parties formed the government with Charan Singh as the Chief Minister of Uttar Pradesh.

Election results
Source:

content://media/external/downloads/39116

Elected members

References

State Assembly elections in Uttar Pradesh
Uttar